The Dutch version of Nickelodeon, broadcasting free-to-cable in the Netherlands and through satellite in Belgium, and launched on 14 July 2003. In addition to the general Nickelodeon programmes, original productions such as ZOOP, Het Huis Anubis, and SuperNick are also broadcast. The Dutch Kids' Choice Awards were presented in three years (2004, 2005 and 2007), featuring nominees that are relevant to Dutch audiences. In 2010, the US Kids' Choice Awards aired, which included categories for the Netherlands and Belgium inserted into the broadcast.

Nickelodeon has a separate version in Belgium with advertising and programming variations for Belgian viewers. All Belgian cable and ISP providers carry the Belgian version, with the satellite provider TV Vlaanderen offering only the Dutch version, as it uses the feed of the Dutch CanalDigitaal.

In recent years, with the increase of on-demand services, the market share of the Nickelodeon channel has declined in the Netherlands. In 2019, the channel recorded an average daily market share of 0.7%, which reduced to 0.4% in 2020. In comparison, Nickelodeon had a market share of 2.1% in 2009.

History 
Nickelodeon replaced a similarly-themed channel, Kindernet (launched in 1988), in 2003 after it was acquired by Viacom at the end of the year 2001. Before this, Nickelodeon aired as a programming block on Kindernet from 1.00 to 3.00 PM, starting in February 2002. Throughout the course of 2003, Nickelodeon programming began to gain more prominence on Kindernet outside of the block, before expanding into a 24-hour channel on 14 July. As a result, Kindernet was degraded into a morning block, which later became Nick Jr.

On 1 August 2005, Nickelodeon began time-sharing with Talpa, now airing between 6.00 AM and 6.00 PM. By the end of the year 2006, MTV's deal with Talpa ended and Nickelodeon began sharing channel space with The Box Comedy on 1 December. Nickelodeon extended its airtime up until 8.00 PM and The Box Comedy changed into Comedy Central on 30 April 2007.

Comedy Central switched to TMF on 1 January 2011, and Nickelodeon resumed its 24-hour broadcast on 14 February. Sometime after, a TeenNick block was added to the channel's schedule during the overnight hours, airing between 9.00 PM and 6.00 AM. All programming on Nickelodeon's regular schedule is available in Dutch, with the exception of Dutch-Belgian productions.

A high-definition simulcast of Nickelodeon was slated to launch through UPC Netherlands on 3 April 2012, but ended up being delayed due to technical issues. Nickelodeon HD eventually launched on 13 September 2012, the time through KPN Interactive TV.

On 1 October 2015, sister channel Spike was launched and initially aired during Nickelodeon's overnight hours. On 12 December 2016, Spike became its own 24-hour channel on Ziggo, before launching on other providers (such as KPN, Telfort, XS4ALL, Caiway and T-Mobile Thuis) three months later.

Nickelodeon continues to air 24/7 in the Netherlands, broadcasting TeenNick programming at night and also introducing a version of The Splat. In Belgium, Spike and Nickelodeon continue to time-sharing.

Programming (currently and formerly)

Original

Animated
 SpongeBob SquarePants
 Kamp Koral: SpongeBob's Under Years
 Avatar: The Last Airbender
 The Legend of Korra
 The Loud House
 It's Pony
 Back at the Barnyard
 The Penguins of Madagascar
 Monsters vs Aliens
 Kung Fu Panda: Legends of Awesomeness
 ChalkZone
 Breadwinners
 Teenage Mutant Ninja Turtles
 Aaahh!!! Real Monsters
 KaBlam!
 Tak and the Power of Juju
 Rugrats
 All Grown Up!
 CatDog
 The Ren & Stimpy Show
 Danny Phantom
 Harvey Beaks
 Pig Goat Banana Cricket
 Catscratch
 The Angry Beavers
 Hey Arnold!
 Invader Zim
 As Told by Ginger
 Bunsen Is a Beast
 The Adventures of Kid Danger
 Kappa Mikey
 The Fairly OddParents
 Rise of the TMNT
 The Casagrandes
 El Tigre: The Adventures of Manny Rivera
 T.U.F.F. Puppy
 Planet Sheen
 Rainbow Butterfly Unicorn Kitty
 Fanboy & Chum Chum
 Sanjay and Craig
 The Adventures of Jimmy Neutron: Boy Genius
 Rocko's Modern Life
 The Wild Thornberrys
 Rocket Power
 The X's
 My Life as a Teenage Robot
 The Mighty B!

Live-action
 Big Time Rush
 Drake & Josh
 True Jackson, VP
 Victorious
 Bucket & Skinner's Epic Adventures
 Power Rangers
 Supah Ninjas
 You Gotta See This
 Sam & Cat
 The Haunted Hathaways
 The Thundermans
 iCarly
 The Amanda Show
 Kenan & Kel
 Cousin Skeeter
 Journey of Allen Strange
 Hotel 13
 Summer in Transylvania
 Genie in the House
 Renford Rejects
 Noah Knows Best
 The Brothers Garcia
 Clarissa Explains It All
 Marvin Marvin
 ZOOP
 Het Huis Anubis
 Ned's Declassified School Survival Guide
 Bad Candy Was Here
 The Naked Brothers Band
 The Troop
 Unfabulous
 Zoey 101
 Henry Danger
 Game Shakers
 Nicky, Ricky, Dicky & Dawn
 100 Things to Do Before High School
 De Ludwigs
 Are You Afraid of the Dark? (reboot)
 Every Witch Way
 I Am Frankie
 Bella and the Bulldogs
 Knight Squad
 Nickelodeon: Unleashed
 The Substitute
 Danger Force
 Side Hustle
 Drama Club
 Creative Camp
 NOOBees
 Spyders

Short interstitials
 Cool Factor
 Nick Extra
 De klas uit!
 Shake It!
 Nick's Flix
 Special Me
 Max Adventures 
 SuperNick
 Nick Battle
 HiHi met SiSi
 Nick At
 Puppy Patrol
 So Nick
 De Ballen
 Sportlets
 ANWB Explorers
 Gefopt!

Acquired

Animated
 I.N.K.: Invisible Network Of Kids
 Mr. Bean
 Johnny Test
 3-2-1 Penguins!
 Animaniacs
 Pinky & the Brain
 Bratz
 Winx Club
 PopPixie
 Totally Spies!
 Four Eyes
 Lucky Luke
 Cosmic Quantum Ray
 Rabbids Invasion
 ALVINNN!!! and the Chipmunks
 Corneil & Bernie
 Dragon Hunters
 Flatmania
 Edgar & Ellen
 Frankenstein's Cat
 Geronimo Stilton
 Delilah & Julius
 Grossology
 Fat Dog Mendoza
 Growing Up Creepie
 League of Super Evil My Dad the Rock Star Lola & Virginia Martin Mystery Argai Monster Allergy Potatoes & Dragons Ricky Sprocket: Showbiz Boy Yakkity Yak Sabrina: The Animated Series Wayside Speed Racer: The Next Generation Trolls: TrollsTopia Trollz Spliced Viva Piñata Skyland Lego City Adventures Barbie: Dreamhouse Adventures Pokémon The Boss Baby: Back in Business Ollie's Pack Dorg Van Dango Jurassic World: Camp Cretaceous  Kitty Is Not a CatLive-action
 Wingin' It Chica Vampiro Make It Pop The Other Kingdom Star Falls Just Add Magic 
 Sweet Valley High My Parents Are Aliens The Saddle Club Naturally, Sadie Sabrina, the Teenage Witch Life with Boys Saved by the BellNick Jr.
 44 Cats The Adventures of Paddington The Backyardigans Ben & Holly's Little Kingdom Blaze and the Monster Machines Blue's Clues Boobah Bruno and the Banana Bunch Bubble Guppies Caillou Clifford the Big Red Dog Domo Dora and Friends: Into the City! Dora the Explorer Fifi and the Flowertots Go, Diego, Go! Jellabies Lunar Jim Max & Ruby The Magic School Bus Make Way for Noddy Mr. Men and Little Miss Miss Spider's Sunny Patch Friends Ni Hao, Kai-Lan Oswald PAW Patrol Paz Peppa Pig Pingu Rolie Polie Olie Rupert Bear, Follow the Magic... Rusty Rivets Shaun the Sheep Thomas & Friends Timmy Time Team Umizoomi Tots TV Wallykazam! Wanda and the Alien The Wonder Pets Zingen met PaulaCarriage history

Most-watched broadcasts per year
Since 2002, Stichting Kijkonderzoek (SKO)'' has been monitoring the viewer ratings for Nickelodeon programmes in the Netherlands. Between 2003 and 2017, SKO published an annual list of the most-watched broadcasts of the channel. From 2018 onwards, it publishes a list of the most-watched programmes within the Viacom-owned network.

Sister channels

Nicktoons

Nicktoons is a Dutch TV channel broadcasting in the Netherlands and Belgium, which mostly airs cartoons. It launched together with NickMusic on 2 August 2007. At daytime the cartoons are dubbed in Dutch and at night the cartoons are spoken in English, but subtitled in Dutch.

Nick Jr.

Nick Jr. is a preschooler's channel and is the sister channel to Nickelodeon. After the transition of Kindernet to Nickelodeon in 2003 Nick Jr. became a programme block on Nickelodeon in the morning. Nick Jr. would launch as a separate 24-hour channel on 1 January 2005 but due to some capacity issues it eventually launched a few months later on 1 May.

NickMusic

NickMusic (formerly Nick Hits) is a digital music video channel for children. It launched together with Nicktoons on 2 August 2007.

References

External links
 Nickelodeon Nederland

Television channels in the Netherlands
Netherlands
Children's television networks
Television channels and stations established in 2003
Television channels in Belgium
2002 establishments in the Netherlands
2003 establishments in Belgium